Discartemon is a genus of air-breathing land snails, terrestrial pulmonate gastropod mollusks in the family Streptaxidae.

Distribution 
The distribution of the genus Discartemon includes South-East Asia.

Species
Species within the genus Discartemon include:
 Discartemon afthonodontia Siriboon & Panha, 2014
 Discartemon circulus Siriboon & Panha, 2014
 Discartemon collingeiSiriboon & Panha, 2014
 Discartemon conicus Siriboon & Panha, 2014
 Discartemon deprima Siriboon & Panha, 2014
 Discartemon discadentus Siriboon & Panha, 2014
 Discartemon discamaximus Siriboon & Panha, 2014
 Discartemon discus (L. Pfeiffer, 1851)
 Discartemon epipedis Siriboon & Panha, 2014
 Discartemon expandus Siriboon & Panha, 2014
 Discartemon flavacandida Siriboon & Panha, 2014
 Discartemon hypocrites van Benthem Jutting, 1954
 Discartemon kotanensis Siriboon & Panha, 2014
 Discartemon leptoglyphus van Benthem Jutting, 1954
 Discartemon megalostraka Siriboon & Panha, 2014
 Discartemon moolenbeeki Maasen, 2016
 Discartemon planus (Fulton, 1899)
 Discartemon platymorphus van Benthem Jutting, 1954
 Discartemon plussensis (de Morgan, 1885)
 Discartemon roebeleni (Möllendorff, 1894)
 Discartemon sagitticallosum Sutcharit, Lin & Panha, 2020
 Discartemon sangkarensis van Benthem Jutting, 1959
 Discartemon stenostomus van Benthem Jutting, 1954
 Discartemon sykesi (Collinge, 1902)
 Discartemon tonywhitteni Sutcharit, Lin & Panha, 2020
 Discartemon triancus Siriboon & Panha, 2014
 Discartemon vandermeermohri van Benthem Jutting, 1959
Species inquirendum
 Discartemon pallgergelyi Thach, 2017 (debated synonym)

References

Sea shells & Land snails., p. 128 pp

External links
 Pfeiffer, L. (1856). Versuch einer Anordnung derr Heliceen nach natürlichen Gruppen. Malakozoologische Blätter. 2: 112-185

Further reading 
 Van Bentham Jutting W. S. S. (1954). "The Malayan Streptaxidae of the genera Discartemon and Oophana". Bulletin of the Raffles Museum 25: 71–106. PDF.

Streptaxidae